The Gender Equality Index is a measurement tool that shows how far (or close) the EU and its Member States are from achieving a gender-equal society. It was developed by the European Institute for Gender Equality (EIGE).

The Index produces a score that between 1 and 100. The best situation is 100, where there are no gender gaps combined with the highest level of achievement.

The Index was published in 2013 and 2015. In October 2017, the third edition was released. The newest one provides scores for four points in time: 2005, 2010, 2012 and 2015.

Purpose of the Gender Equality Index 

The Index aims at supporting evidence-based and better-informed decision-making in the EU. The Gender Equality Index is the only one that gives a comprehensive map of gender inequalities in the EU based on EU policy priorities and realities.

The Index relies on a gender perspective. This means that gender equality is considered to be advantageous to both women and men, while not underplaying the unequal relations of power harming women in society. It also emphasises that all gender gaps are harmful to both women and men.

Areas of gender equality covered 

The Index measures gender equality in eight areas, called ‘domains’, relevant to the EU policy framework. Six of these domains (work, money, knowledge, time, power, and health) are combined into a core Index. Each domain is further divided into sub-domains that cover the key issues within the respective area.

The core Index is complemented by two additional, equally important, satellite domains of violence and intersecting inequalities. They belong to the Index, but do not impact the overall score. The full conceptual framework is presented in the first edition of the Index.

Using this framework, 31 indicators were chosen to monitor developments in gender equality in the six core domains in every Member State as well as at the EU level. The Index is formed by combining these indicators into a single measure, which allows for the issue of gender equality to be synthesised into one core.

Core domains

Satellite domains

Index main results 

The Index points in time: 2005, 2010, 2012 and 2015 for the European Union as a whole, as well as individual Member States. This provides readers with sufficient evidence to assess progress over an entire decade. The main results of the third edition of the Index were released in Brussels on 11 October 2017, and were livestreamed on EIGE's website.

Progress towards gender equality in the EU-28 is rather slow – the Gender Equality Index score for EU-28 in 2015 stood at 66.2 out of 100, representing a 4.2-point increase in ten years. 

The biggest improvement towards gender equality over the past decade has been in the domain of power, especially in economic decision-making. However, while it has made the most progress, its score remains the lowest of all domains. The least amount of progress in gender equality has been in the domain of time. Progress has slipped in 12 countries when it comes to the time use of women and men. Only every third man engages daily in cooking and housework, compared to almost eight in ten women (79%). Men also have more time for sporting, cultural and leisure activities.

The third edition contains methodological updates. In addition to political and economic power, the Index also looks at who is behind the news headlines, who controls the money in research funding and who decides in the sporting world in the EU. These measurements now form an integral part of the power domain. For the first time, the Index also looks into healthy and risky behaviours of women and men. Who has a healthy diet and exercises regularly? How similar are the smoking and drinking habits of women and men in the EU? The answers to these questions make an impact on the final Index score in the domain of health.

The Gender Equality Index will be updated every two years until 2019. From then on it will be updated annually.

Gender Equality Index reports 

 (2013), Gender Equality Index Report
 (2017), Gender Equality Index 2017 in brief: A snail’s pace towards gender equality
 (2017), Gender Equality Index 2017: Main findings
 (2017), Gender Equality Index 2017: Measuring gender equality in the European Union 2005-2015
 (2017), Gender Equality Index 2017: Methodological report
 (2017), Gender Equality Index 2017: Measurement framework of violence against women 
 (2017), Gender Equality Index 2017: Intersecting inequalities

External links 

 The Gender Equality Index Website
 Video presenting the Gender Equality Index 2017
 European Institute for Gender Equality website
 European Commission and Gender equality
 European Parliament Women's Rights and Gender Equality (FEMM) Committee

References 

Agencies of the European Union
Gender equality